An apologia (Latin for apology, from Greek ἀπολογία, "speaking in defense") is a formal defense of an opinion, position or action. The term's current use, often in the context of religion, theology and philosophy, derives from Justin Martyr's First Apology (AD 155–157) and was later employed by John Henry Newman's Apologia Pro Vita Sua (English: A Defense of One's Own Life) of 1864, which presented  a formal defense of the history of his Christian life, leading to his acceptance by the Catholic Church in 1845.  In modern usage, apologia describes a formal defense and should not be confused with the sense of the word 'apology' as an expression of regret; however, apology may mean apologia, depending on the context of use.

Etymology 
The etymology of apologia is derived from the root word apologos, "a speech in defense", and the corresponding verb form apologeisthai "to speak in one's defense". The Greek philosophers Plato, Isocrates, and Aristotle described apologia as an oratory to defend positions or actions particularly in the sense of a legal defense.

Socrates believed an apology to be a well-thought justification of accusations made. Socrates represents this act of defending oneself in Plato's Apology. Socrates justified the claims made against him by being direct and honest.  Socrates' attempts at justification rather than expressing remorse were unsuccessful, demonstrating the complexity in apologies among individuals.

Evolution of usage 
The earliest English use of apologia followed from the Greek sense “a speech in defense". In 1590, a  parallel meaning emerged meaning a "frank expression of regret". This parallel sense  associated with "apologizing" for a wrong, progressively became the predominant usage until the 18th century when the older Latin meaning re-emerged to be recorded in 1784. This became the dominant meaning, owing in a large part to the publication of the influential work, Apologia Pro Vita Sua, in 1865.

Apologia Pro Vita Sua 
John Henry Newman was regarded as a premiere religious figure even before writing his definitive essay, Apologia Pro Vita Sua. The backdrop for the essay was a heated mid-century theological controversy. Newman and other Anglicans were calling for the Anglican church to return to earlier, more disciplined, traditions and an authoritarian hierarchy. Friction during the years from 1833 to 1841 led Newman and his allies in the Oxford Movement to publish a statement, the Tracts for the Times, to which Newman was a contributor. The tensions culminated in Newman's 1845 resignation as Anglican vicar of St. Mary's, Oxford and his departure from the Anglican church seeking to join the Roman Catholic Church.[1].

One of Newman's rivals was Anglican Charles Kingsley of the Broad Church party, who responded to Newman's departure with written attacks impeaching Newman's truthfulness and honor. Newman's response was the flowing, almost poetic prose of the Apologia Pro Vita Sua, offering a spiritual autobiographical defense to Kingsley's accusations. The book was ultimately very well received by Anglicans and Catholics and was influential in turning public opinion in favor of Newman. The book became a bestseller that remains in print today. Two years after its publication, Newman was ordained by the Roman Catholics and soon became established as one of the foremost exponents of Catholicism in England.[1]

Apologia Pro Marcel Lefebvre 

Roman Catholic writer Michael Davies later wrote a three-volume work entitled Apologia Pro Marcel Lefebvre, defending the SSPX founder, Archbishop Marcel Lefebvre. Davies wrote in his introduction to the first volume that the use of the term apologia in the title is used as a "reasoned explanation", rather than literal apology, in the same vein as the early Christian apologists.

Modern analysis 
In her 1993 article,  "The Evolution of the Rhetorical Genre of Apologia", Sharon Downey argues that apologia has undergone significant changes because its function has changed throughout history. Downey takes on a critical generic approach to the feasibility of apologia. 

Halford Ryan advocates that apologia should be understood as part of a pair with kategoria, an accusatory speech that motivates apologia as a defensive response. Ryan argues that these should be treated as a single rhetorical speech set. 

Ware and Linkugel (1973) identified four common strategies seen in apologetic discourse which are denial, bolstering, differentiation, and transcendence.

See also
 Christian apologetics

References

Rhetorical techniques
Apologetics